William Timym,  (1902–1990) was an artist whose best known work is probably the Bleep and Booster cartoons for the BBC's Blue Peter.

Timym (pronounced Tim) was Austrian, grew up in Vienna and studied at the Academy of Fine Arts Vienna.  He moved to England in 1938 because of the Nazi occupation of Austria and during the Second World War produced a number of works for the Ministry of Information.

He became a naturalised British citizen in April 1949.

He was also a bronze sculptor and created many realistic (rather than stylised) wildlife sculptures. These include a statue of Blue Peter'''s dog Petra, a lion bust at Gloucester's Nature in Art museum, a lifesize Sumatran white rhino at Howletts Wild Animal Park in Canterbury, and a 15 ft elephant fountain at Saint Louis Zoo. Other cartoons he produced include Bengo the Boxer puppy and Wuff, Snuff and Tuff''.

References

External links
http://lambiek.net/artists/t/tim.htm
http://www.whirligig-tv.co.uk/tv/children/other/bengo.htm

1920 births
1990 deaths
Austrian illustrators
Austrian sculptors
Austrian male sculptors
Academy of Fine Arts Vienna alumni
Members of the Order of the British Empire
Saint Louis Zoo people
20th-century sculptors
Austrian refugees
Austrian emigrants to the United Kingdom